Rafael Monti Azpiazu (born 8 December 1999) is an Argentine professional footballer who plays as a forward for Acassuso.

Career
Monti's career began with Acassuso, initially in their youth system. He made his bow at first-team level on 24 April 2019 under manager Alejandro Friederich, who selected him off the substitutes bench during a Copa Argentina defeat to Colón of the Primera División; replacing Esteban Pipino at the Estadio Alfredo Beranger.

Personal life
Lorenzo Monti is Rafael's brother, he is also a professional footballer who started his career in the ranks of Acassuso.

Career statistics
.

References

External links

1999 births
Living people
Place of birth missing (living people)
Argentine footballers
Association football forwards
Club Atlético Acassuso footballers